Chiara Valerio (Formia) is an Italian author and essayist.

Biography 
Chiara Valerio was born in Formia (in the Lazio region) in 1978 and spent her childhood and youth in Scauri (also in Lazio). She has obtained a PhD in Mathematics at the University of Naples Federico II. She currently lives in Rome.

She works as editor for the Italian magazine Nuovi Argomenti and has contributed to the literary blog Nazione Indiana. She has also written for the radio, as well as theatre pieces, and she has worked with the newspapers Il Sole 24 ORE and L'Unità and with the cultural broadcasting Pane quotidiano on the Italian national television channel Rai 3.  
She has directed the series "narrativa.it" for the publishing house nottetempo, which is dedicated to today's Italian fiction. 
Together with Anna Antonelli, Fabiana Carobolante and Lorenzo Pavolini, she curates the radio broadcast "Ad alta voce" on Rai Radio 3. On Rai Radio 3 she is a radio host on "L'Isola Deserta". She participated in the writing of the main character of Nanni Moretti's film Mia Madre, together with Nanni Moretti, Valia Santella and Gaia Manzini, as well as in that of Gianni Amelio's film Tenderness, together with Gianni Amelio and Alberto Taraglio. 
She currently works as editor in chief for the section dedicated to Italian narrative of the publishing house Marsilio, she writes for the Italian newspaper La Repubblica, for Vanity Fair, for the weekly publication L'Espresso, and for the monthly publication Amica.

In October 2016, she was named cultural director for "Tempo di libri", the newly created Milan book fair.

Awards 
In 2007, the literature festival of the city of Mantua, Festivaletteratura, chose Chiara Valerio as the Italian author for "Yound Writings 2007". In 2014, she won the award "Premio Fiesole Narrativa Under 40" with her book Almanacco del giorno prima.

Works 
 A complicare le cose, Roma, Robin, 2003, 
 Fermati un minuto a salutare, Roma, Robin, 2006
 Ognuno sta solo, Roma, Perrone, 2007, 
 Nessuna scuola mi consola, Roma, Nottetempo 2009, 
 Spiaggia libera tutti, Roma, Bari, Laterza, 2010, 
 La gioia piccola d'esser quasi salvi, Roma, Nottetempo 2009, 
 Almanacco del giorno prima, Torino, Einaudi, 2014, 
 Storia umana della matematica, Torino, Einaudi, 2016, 
 Il cuore non si vede, Torino, Einaudi, 2019,

Translations and curatorships 
 Virginia Woolf, Flush, Roma, Nottetempo, 2012, 
 Virginia Woolf, Freshwater, Roma, Nottetempo, 2013, 
 Virginia Woolf, Tra un atto e l'altro, Roma, Nottetempo, 2015,

References

1978 births
Living people
Italian women writers
University of Naples Federico II alumni